Teresa Saponangelo (born 22 October 1973) is an Italian film, television and stage actress.

Life and career 
Born in Taranto, Saponangelo is the daughter of a workman and a housewife. Her father died when she was two years old, and in 1976 she moved to Naples with her mother and her brother.

After attending several dramatic societies, Saponangelo made her official stage debut in Giacomo Rizzo's Ce penza mammà. After not being admitted to the acting schools of Piccolo Teatro and Accademia Nazionale, Saponangelo studied at the Palmi Drama School in Reggio Calabria, at the suggestion of Giorgio Albertazzi.

In 1994 she made her film debut in Il Verificatore by Stefano Incerti, and then appeared in films directed by Paolo and Vittorio Taviani, Sergio Rubini, Paolo Virzì, and Silvio Soldini, and on stage with directors Toni Servillo, Antonio Capuano, and Mario Martone, among others. In 2000 she was nominated for Nastro d'Argento's Best Actress thanks to her performance in Anna Negri's In the Beginning There Was Underwear; the same year she won the Ubu Award for her performance as Dorina in the stage play Tartufo.

References

External links 
 
 

Italian film actresses
Italian television actresses
Italian stage actresses
1973 births
People from Taranto
Living people